Maya Singh (born 15 August 1950) is an Indian politician from Bharatiya Janata Party and a former Member of Parliament representing Madhya Pradesh in Rajya Sabha. She is a former cabinet minister in Government of Madhya Pradesh holding the portfolio of 'Women and Child Development' till 2016 and 'Urban development and Housing' from 2016 to December 2018.

On 8 December 2013 she was elected as MLA after winning Legislative Assembly elections in Gwalior with 59,824 votes.

References

External links
 Profile on Rajya Sabha website

Living people
1950 births
Bharatiya Janata Party politicians from Madhya Pradesh
People from Gwalior
Rajya Sabha members from Madhya Pradesh
Madhya Pradesh MLAs 2013–2018
State cabinet ministers of Madhya Pradesh
21st-century Indian women politicians
21st-century Indian politicians
Women state cabinet ministers of India
Women members of the Rajya Sabha
Women members of the Madhya Pradesh Legislative Assembly